VV Heerenveen is a football club from Heerenveen, Netherlands. VV Heerenveen plays in the 2017–18 Sunday Hoofdklasse A.

References

External links
 Official site

Football clubs in the Netherlands
Football clubs in Heerenveen
Association football clubs established in 1920
1920 establishments in the Netherlands